The John C. Williams House (also known as the Manhattan Hotel or Williams Mansion) is a historic home in St. Petersburg, Florida. Originally located at 444 5th Avenue South, it was subsequently purchased by the University of South Florida and moved to 511 Second Street South, on the Bayboro campus. On April 24, 1975, it was added to the U.S. National Register of Historic Places.

References

This house was built in 1891 and is Queen Ann architecture. Today it serves as the University of South Florida St. Petersburg Developmental Offices.

External links

 Pinellas County listings at National Register of Historic Places
 Florida's Office of Cultural and Historical Programs
 Pinellas County listings
 John C. Williams House

Houses on the National Register of Historic Places in Florida
National Register of Historic Places in Pinellas County, Florida
Houses in St. Petersburg, Florida
1891 establishments in Florida
Houses completed in 1891